Below are the full rosters and coaching staff of the 18 teams of Minor League Baseball's Arizona Complex League.

Arizona Complex League Angels

Arizona Complex League Athletics

Arizona Complex League Brewers Blue

Arizona Complex League Brewers Gold

Arizona Complex League Cubs

Arizona Complex League Diamondbacks Black

Arizona Complex League Diamondbacks Red

Arizona Complex League Dodgers

Arizona Complex League Giants Black

Arizona Complex League Giants Orange

Arizona Complex League Guardians

Arizona Complex League Mariners

Arizona Complex League Padres

Arizona Complex League Rangers

Arizona Complex League Reds

Arizona Complex League Rockies

Arizona Complex League Royals

Arizona Complex League White Sox

See also
Florida Complex League rosters

Arizona Complex League
Rosters